The Supreme Burgrave of the Kingdom of Bohemia, originally the Burgrave of Prague or the Burgrave of Prague Castle (Czech: Nejvyšší purkrabí; German: Oberstburggraf; Latin: supremus burgravius) was the most important land official of the Kingdom of Bohemia.

The supreme burgrave was appointed directly by the king, was appointed for life and could only be deposed in exceptional circumstances.

History
In the Crown of the Kingdom of Bohemia, the title of burgrave was given by the King of Bohemia to the chief officer, or the regal official whose command is equivalent to a viceroy's. From the 14th century, the burgrave of Prague—the highest-ranking of all burgraves, seated at Prague Castle, gradually became the state's highest-ranking official, who also acted as the king's deputy; the office became known as the high or supreme burgrave of the Kingdom of Bohemia. After the reforms of Maria Theresa (reign 1740–1780) and her son Joseph II (reign 1780–1790), the title of supreme burgrave gradually lost its de facto power. The title of supreme burgrave was still granted, however, and its holder remained the first officer of the kingdom. It was abolished in 1848.

List

See also
Supreme Marshal of the Kingdom of Bohemia
High Chancellor of Bohemia

Notes

References
 
 
 
 
 Všeobecná encyklopedie 3 . Prague: Diderot, 1999. p. 230. ISBN 80-902555-5-8. 
 Schulz, Václav Purkrabí Hradu pražského v letech 1438 - 1711 Архивная копия от 17 апреля 2019 на Wayback Machine
 Tomek, Vácslav Vladivoj Děje království českého Архивная копия от 10 сентября 2012 на Wayback Machine// Česká čítanka
Defunct government agencies